is a renowned Japanese photographer.

External links
 Yōichi Midorikawa - official site

References

Japanese photographers
1915 births
2001 deaths